Mount Albert railway station is in the suburb of Mount Albert on the Western Line of the Auckland railway network in New Zealand, near Unitec, a local tertiary education provider, and is popular with Unitec students. It has an island platform and is reached by a footbridge from Carrington Road at the northern end, an overbridge from New North Road on the eastern side, and a subway that runs between Willcott Street and New North Road at the southern end.

History 

 1880: Opened as one of the original stations on the North Auckland Line.
 1908: A signal box was added.
 1909: A new station building was built, after the previous one was destroyed by fire.
 1920s: A siding to Mount Albert Quarry from the station is closed.
 1966: The line was double-tracked and much of the station's infrastructure (including the signal box) was removed. The signal box is preserved at MOTAT.
 2010: Significant discussion, including during the run-up to the local body elections, considered the station (and especially its access-ways and weather shelters) as dilapidated and in need of renewal. Also particularly criticised were the run-down shop rear areas fronting the railway station from the New North Road side. A former Auckland City councilor suggested that a green wall would offer an option to hide these unsightly areas behind low-cost, low-maintenance planting.
 2013: The station was upgraded as part of a 2-stage Auckland Transport program in anticipation of the Auckland railway electrification project. The $9 million upgrade, which included an overhead covered walkway from Carrington Road, new passenger shelters, and other enhancements, was ceremonially opened in July 2013. The second stage, which was to include a $1.23 million overbridge walkway to New North Road, was scheduled to be completed by August 2016.
 2016: The overbridge, connecting the station directly to the pedestrian precinct of the Mount Albert shopping area, was opened on 17 September 2016.

Services 
A number of bus services pass this station, allowing easy transfer, although there are no signs or information provided at the station. These include routes 22N, 22R, 66, 209 and the Outer Link.

See also 
 List of Auckland railway stations
 Public transport in Auckland

References 

Rail transport in Auckland
Railway stations in New Zealand
Railway stations opened in 1880
Buildings and structures in Auckland